Kim Bok-seop (born 28 October 1966) is a South Korean sprinter. He competed in the men's 4 × 100 metres relay at the 1988 Summer Olympics.

References

1966 births
Living people
Athletes (track and field) at the 1988 Summer Olympics
South Korean male sprinters
Olympic athletes of South Korea
Place of birth missing (living people)
20th-century South Korean people